Kearneysville is an unincorporated community in Jefferson and Berkeley Counties, in the U.S. state of West Virginia's Eastern Panhandle in the lower Shenandoah Valley. According to the 2000 census, Kearneysville and its surrounding community has a population of 6,716.

Sites on the National Register of Historic Places

References

External links 

Kearneysville Tree Fruit Research and Education Center
Leetown Science Center
North Jefferson Elementary School
Prospect Hall Shooting & Hunting Club

Unincorporated communities in Jefferson County, West Virginia
Unincorporated communities in West Virginia
Baltimore and Ohio Railroad
1756 establishments in Virginia
Populated places established in 1756